At least three warships of Russia have borne the name Pallada:

 , a sailing frigate
 , the lead ship of her class of protected cruisers. The ship was launched in 1899 and sunk at Port Arthur in December 1904.
Launched in 1911 and, sunk by a German submarine in the Baltic Sea on 11 October 1914 shortly after the outbreak of World War I.

See also
 , a modern tallship

Russian Navy ship names